John "Big" Chisum (April 5, 1915 – August 5, 1982), also listed as John Chism, was an American baseball third baseman in the Negro leagues. He played with the St. Louis Stars in 1937.
His brother, Eli, also played in the Negro leagues. and his statistics are combined with John's in some sources.

References

External links
 and Seamheads
 John Chisum at Arkansas Baseball Encyclopedia

St. Louis Stars (1937) players
1915 births
1982 deaths
Baseball players from Arkansas
Baseball third basemen
20th-century African-American sportspeople